Flax vanuatui is a moth of the family Erebidae first described by Michael Fibiger in 2011. It is found in Vanuatu (it was described from south-western Espiritu Santo).

The wingspan is 8-8.5 mm. The forewings are beige, with light-brown patches on the base of the costa and a quadrangular costal medial area, with a black dot at the inner lower edge. The crosslines are light brown. The terminal line is indicated by brown interveinal dots. The hindwings are light grey. The underside of the forewings is unicolorous brown and the underside of the hindwings is grey with a discal spot.

References

Micronoctuini
Moths described in 2011
Taxa named by Michael Fibiger